Makthal is a Mandal in Narayanpet district, Telangana. It is also an assembly constituency in the Telangana Legislative Assembly.

Geography
It has an average elevation of 391 metres (1283 ft).

Demography
According to The Imperial Gazetteer of India, Makhtal in 1901 was a taluk in Mahbubnagar district, Hyderabad State. It covers an area of 511 square miles. The population, spread over 120 villages, was 69,560, compared with 68,031 in 1891. The taluk headquarters Makhtal had a population of 4,476. in 1905, the taluk was enlarged by the addition of some villages from Narayanpet, but lost 31 villages to Yadgir in Gulbarga district. It has the famous temple called "Padamati Anjaneyya Swamy Temple" where god's statue stands in air without any support. Here is a famous temple Sri dattatreya swamy (kurumgadda & vallabapuram) which is located at Paspula village near to makthal(15 km)

List of MLAs

References

Mandals in Mahbubnagar district